Bozhidar Grigorov (born 27 July 1945) is a retired Bulgarian footballer.

Grigorov is best known for his career with Slavia Sofia, for whom he made over 300 appearances in 12 seasons with the club. He played for Slavia in the 1969–70 Inter-Cities Fairs Cup, scoring two goals in the team's 1st round victory over Valencia CF.

Grigorov played 7 times and scored 2 goals for Bulgaria. He was in the Bulgarian squad for both the 1970 and 1974 World Cups.

References

External links
 

1945 births
Living people
Footballers from Sofia
Bulgarian footballers
Bulgaria international footballers
1970 FIFA World Cup players
1974 FIFA World Cup players
PFC Slavia Sofia players
First Professional Football League (Bulgaria) players
Association football forwards